Thomas Lowndes Bullock, FRS (27 September 1845 – 20 March 1915) was an English author, colonial administrator, academic and sinologist who served as Professor of Chinese at the University of Oxford. He was the father of diplomat and explorer Guy Bullock.

Early life

Bullock was born in Radwinter, Essex to John Frederick Bullock (1809 - 1865), Rector of Radwinter, and his first-cousin, Elizabeth Anne Bullock (born 1814), daughter of Jonathan Bullock of Faulkbourne and Margaret Downes. He was a member of the old Bullock family of the Faulkbourne branch of the family, descended from Sir Edward Bullock. He attended Winchester College and New College, Oxford.

Career
Following University, Bullock was appointed as a member of Her Britannic Majesty's consular service in China from 1869–97. He was appointed a Barrister of the Inner Temple in 1890. From 1899 he went on to be appointed Professor of Chinese at the University of Oxford, a position now called Shaw Professor of Chinese following the donation of Sir Run Run Shaw.

Family
Bullock married Florence Louisa Elizabeth Horton, daughter of Samuel Lewis Horton of The Park House, Shifnal and Ann Maria Philips, they had three children:
 Agnes Violet Bullock, 1884 - 1897.
 Margaret Annie Bullock, born 1886, married in 1920 to Sir Claud Severn, and had issue.
Guy Henry Bullock, British diplomat, born 1887, married in 1916 to Laura Alice McGloin.

Publications

Books
 Progressive Exercises In The Chinese Written Language, 1901 
 Progressive Exercises in the Chinese Written Language, 2nd edition, revised and enlarged, 1912

Articles
  
  
 (tr.) Peking Gazettes (1887–89)

References

1845 births
1915 deaths
People educated at Winchester College
Alumni of New College, Oxford
British writers
British consuls
British sinologists
British academics
British barristers
British translators
Members of the Inner Temple
Shaw Professors of Chinese
Fellows of University College, Oxford